Mordechaï Podchlebnik or Michał Podchlebnik (1907 – 1985) was a Polish Jew who managed to survive the Holocaust. He was a member of the Sonderkommando work detail for nearly two weeks at the Chełmno extermination camp in occupied Poland. Podchlebnik was one of at least three prisoners who escaped into the surrounding forest from the mass burial zone.

Life
He was born to a family of Jacob Podchlebnik and Sosia (Zosia) née Widawska from Koło, known also by the Polish equivalent of his first name, Michał. He witnessed the deportation of his father, mother, sister with her five children, and brother with his own wife and three children. Podchlebnik became a key witness in 1945 at the Chełmno Trials of the former SS men from the SS Special Detachment Kulmhof. Decades later in 1961 he gave testimony at the Eichmann trial in Jerusalem. Podchlebnik was also interviewed by Claude Lanzmann for the documentary film Shoah.

References

External links
Mordechai (Michael) Podchlebnik - Chelmno at United States Holocaust Memorial Museum (USHMM)

1907 births
1985 deaths
People from Piotrków County
People from Piotrków Governorate
Chełmno extermination camp survivors
Jews from the Russian Empire
20th-century Polish Jews
Sonderkommando

 
Holocaust commemoration